KILL is the 4th single of I've Sound singer, Mell. It is released on November 19, 2008, a year and almost two months after the release of her 3rd single. The title track will be used as the opening theme for Mamoru Oshii's live-action film entitled  while the B-side song On my own will be used as the ending theme for the same film. Since this single only reached #37 in the Oricon weekly charts and only charted for two weeks, this is Mell's weakest single to date.

The single will come in a regular CD-only edition (GNCV-0012) and a limited CD+DVD edition (GNCV-0011) which will contain the PV for KILL.

Track listing 

KILL—4:53
Lyrics: Mell
Composition/Arrangement: Kazuya Takase
On my own—5:10
Lyrics: Mell
Composition/Arrangement: Tomoyuki Nakazawa
KILL (instrumental) -- 4:53
On my own (instrumental) -- 5:07

Charts and sales

References

2008 singles
Mell songs
Song recordings produced by I've Sound
Japanese film songs
2008 songs